Elections to Basingstoke and Deane Borough Council took place on Thursday 2 May 2019, alongside other local elections across the country. Elections took place in 20 of the 60 seats.

Results 
The Conservative Party lost two seats to the Liberal Democrats, whilst Labour held their incumbent seats. Whilst Labour remained the second largest party (and largest opposition party), the Liberal Democrats won more votes for the first time. 

The table below only tallies the votes of the highest polling candidate for each party within each ward. This is known as the top candidate method and is often used for multi-member plurality elections.

Results by Ward

Basing

Baughurst and Tadley North

Bramley and Sherfield

Brighton Hill North

Burghclere, Highclere and St Mary Bourne

Chineham

Eastrop

Grove

Hatch Warren and Beggarwood

Kempshott

Kingsclere

Norden

Oakley and North Waltham

Overton, Laverstoke & Steventon

Pamber and Silchester

South Ham

Tadley Central

Tadley South

Upton Grey and the Candovers

Winklebury

References

Basingstoke and Deane Borough Council elections
Basingstoke
May 2019 events in the United Kingdom
2010s in Hampshire